Bala Golema (also Romanized as Bālā Golemā; also known as Golemā-ye Bālā and Golmā-ye Bālā) is a village in Miandorud-e Kuchak Rural District, in the Central District of Sari County, Mazandaran Province, Iran. At the 2006 census, its population was 766, in 199 families.

References 

Populated places in Sari County